Dimethylzinc, also known as zinc methyl, DMZ, or DMZn, is an organozinc compound with the chemical formula . It belongs to the large series of similar compounds such as diethylzinc.

Preparation
It is formed by the action of methyl iodide on zinc at elevated temperature or on zinc-sodium alloy. 

The sodium assists the reaction of the zinc with the methyl iodide. Zinc iodide is formed as a byproduct.

Properties

Dimethylzinc is a colorless mobile volatile liquid, which has a characteristic disagreeable garlic-like odor. It is a very reactive and strong reducing agent. It is soluble in alkanes and often sold as a solution in hexanes. The triple point of dimethylzinc is  ± 0.02 K. The monomeric molecule of dimethylzinc is linear at Zn center and tetragonal at C centers.

Toxicity and hazards
Inhalation of dimethylzinc mist or vapor causes immediate irritation of upper respiratory tract, and may cause pneumonia and death. Eyes are immediately and severely irritated and burned by liquid, vapor, or dilute solutions. If not removed by thorough flushing with water, this chemical may permanently damage cornea, eventually causing blindness. If dimethylzinc contacts with the skin, it gets thermal and acid burns, because this chemical reacts with moisture in skin. Unless washed quickly, skin may be scarred. Ingestion, while unlikely, causes immediate burns at site of contact. Nausea, vomiting, cramps, and diarrhea may follow. Tissues may ulcerate if not treated. Upon heating, it decomposes to irritating and toxic products.

Contact of dimethylzinc with oxidants may yield formation of peroxides, which is explosive. Dimethylzinc oxidises in air very slowly, producing methylzinc methoxide . Dimethylzinc is very pyrophoric. It can spontaneously ignite in air. It burns in air with blue flame, giving off peculiar, garlic-like odor. The products of decomposition or fire smoke contains zinc oxide, which itself is not toxic, but its fumes can irritate lungs and cause metal fume fever, severe injury or death. Trying to extinguish dimethylzinc fire with water even intensifies the fire, because dimethylzinc reacts violently or even explosively with water, evolving a very flammable methane gas which can explode in air upon catching fire, and lung-irritating smoke of zinc oxide. The dimethylzinc fire must be extinguished with dry sand. It reacts violently or explosively with methanol, ethanol and 2,2-dichloropropane. It explodes in oxygen and ozone. Improperly handled containers with dimethylzinc can explode, causing serious injuries or death.

Structure
In the solid state the compound exists in two modifications. The tetragonal high-temperature phase shows a two-dimensional disorder, while the low-temperature phase which is monoclinic is ordered. The molecules are linear with Zn-C bond lengths measuring 192.7(6) pm. The structure of the gas-phase shows a very similar Zn-C distance of 193.0(2) pm.

History
Dimethylzinc was first prepared by Edward Frankland during his work with Robert Bunsen in 1849 at the University of Marburg. After heating a mixture of zinc and methyl iodide in an airtight vessel, a flame burst out when the seal was broken. In the laboratory, this synthesis method remains unchanged today, except that copper or copper compounds are used to activate the zinc.

Uses
Dimethylzinc has been of great importance in the synthesis of organic compounds. It was used for a long time to introduce methyl groups into organic molecules or to synthesize organometallic compounds containing methyl groups. Grignard reagents, (organo-magnesium compounds), which are easier to handle and less flammable replaced organo-zinc compounds in most laboratory syntheses. Due to differences in reactivity (as well as in reaction byproducts) between organo-zinc compounds and Grignard reagents, organo-zinc compounds may be preferred in some syntheses.

Its high vapor pressure has led to extensive uses in the production of semiconductors, e.g. metalorganic chemical vapor deposition (MOCVD) for the preparation of wide band gap II–VI semiconducting films (e.g. ZnO, ZnS, ZnSe, ZnTe) and as p-dopant precursors for III–V semiconductors (e.g. AlN, AlP, GaAs, InP), which have many electronic and photonic applications.

It is used as an accelerator in rubber vulcanization, a fungicide, and a methylating agent in methyltitanium trichloride.

References

Methylating agents
Organozinc compounds
Foul-smelling chemicals
Methyl complexes